Roommates is an American television sitcom developed by ABC Family and Acme Productions that premiered on March 23, 2009. On April 29, 2009, it was announced that Roommates would not return for a second season.

Overview
The show focuses on a group of twentysomethings who move in together after college. The show is ABC Family’s first scripted half-hour comedy.

The series follows five very different characters and their struggles through life. The main focus of the show revolves around Mark, a struggling actor, who thinks his dream has come true when he runs into high school crush Katie and finds she is looking for a new roommate. Mark takes the chance, moves in, and starts to find a way to win her heart. Katie, who is completely oblivious to Mark's motives, has a hard time getting over her previous boyfriend, Ben, and looks to Mark for support.

The other two roommates, Hope and James, both have their own problems. Hope is longing for an upscale job after losing her job at the television studio, and James brings in a slapstick sensibility as he takes a delight in watching Mark's attempts to "woo" Katie. The series also includes Thom, Mark's ex-roommate, who feels he is destined to help Mark in his quest to be a unit with Katie.

Cast and characters

Main
 Tyler Francavilla as Mark Fletcher
 Dorian Brown as Katie Bowman
 Tamera Mowry as Hope Daniels
 Tommy Dewey as James
 David Weidoff as Thom

Recurring and special appearances
 Tim Reid as Mr. Stanley Daniels
 Yara Brighton as Alex the Barista
 Tony Yalda as Winston
 Marilu Henner as James' mother
 Felicia Day as Alyssa

Episodes
Each episode began with the title "The" similar to Seinfeld. Only thirteen episodes of the series were aired before it was cancelled.

Response

Ratings

 Episode 1 followed the season finale of The Secret Life of the American Teenager, which had 4.49 million viewers.
 Episode 2 followed the season premiere of Greek, which had 991,000 viewers.

Series cancellation
ABC Family canceled Roommates after only six episodes. Roommates was an attempt by ABC Family to push towards an older audience by stepping out of the teen demographic. Star Tamera Mowry told TV.com that "the tone was more along the lines of ABC Family's hit Greek, which targets older teens and younger adults."

References

External links
 
 

2000s American sitcoms
2009 American television series debuts
2009 American television series endings
ABC Family original programming
Television shows set in New York City
English-language television shows
Television series by Disney–ABC Domestic Television